Territorial integrity is the principle under international law that gives the right to sovereign states to defend their borders and all territory in them of another state. It is enshrined in Article 2(4) of the UN Charter and has been recognized as customary international law. Conversely it states that imposition by force of a border change is an act of aggression.

In recent years there has been tension between this principle and the concept of humanitarian intervention under Article 73.b of the United Nations Charter "to develop self-government, to take due account of the political aspirations of the peoples, and to assist them in the progressive development of their free political institutions, according to the particular circumstances of each territory and its peoples and their varying stages of advancement."

History of territorial integrity
As far back as the earliest written records known, there have been political units claiming a definite territory. Intrusion into these territories was often considered an act of war, and normally resulted in combat. There were also sometimes several layers of authority, with units waging war on each other while both recognising some higher authority. Ancient and medieval nobility would fight private wars amongst while still acknowledging the same king or emperor, such as was case in the Spring and Autumn period in ancient China, when the Eastern Zhou Dynasty were nominal rulers.

Supporters of the concept of Westphalian sovereignty consider that the modern idea of territorial integrity began with the Peace of Westphalia in 1648. However, ancient Chinese and ancient Indigenous cultures of North America and Australia, amongst others, contain diverse territorial understandings surrounding regional integrity.

The League of Nations was intended to uphold territorial integrity and other principles of international law. It did condemn the Italian invasion of Ethiopia. It broadly supported the Chinese Republic over the creation of Manchukuo in Manchuria and eastern Inner Mongolia. Most historians say that the League was discredited by its failure to make these judgements effective.

With the formation of the United Nations (UN) and, later, such organizations as the Conference on Security and Cooperation in Europe (now Organization for Security and Co-operation in Europe), territorial integrity became a part of international resolutions. The Helsinki Final Act dealt with both the inviolability of frontiers and the territorial integrity of States, among other things.

In a changing world
The recent (post-World War II) strict application of territorial integrity has given rise to a number of problems and, when faced with reality "on the ground", can be seen as too artificial a construct.

At the 2005 World Summit, the world's nations agreed on a "Responsibility to Protect", allowing a right for humanitarian intervention. It has been argued that this could create a flexible application of concepts of sovereignty and territorial integrity, easing the strict adherence and taking into account the de facto status of the territory and other factors present on a case by case basis. The United Nations Security Council Resolution 1674, adopted by the United Nations Security Council on April 28, 2006, "Reaffirm[ed] the provisions of paragraphs 138 and 139 of the 2005 World Summit Outcome Document regarding the responsibility to protect populations from genocide, war crimes, ethnic cleansing and crimes against humanity".

However, this responsibility to protect refers only to the ability of external powers to override sovereignty and does not explicitly involve the changing of borders.

The International Court of Justice advisory opinion on Kosovo's declaration of independence claims that territorial integrity is not violated as far as international law is concerned by declarations of independence in themselves.

See also
Breakaway states
Crime of aggression
Secession
Self-determination
1974 Turkish invasion of Cyprus
Russo-Ukrainian War
Turkish occupation of northern Syria
Israeli-occupied territories
Falklands War
Uti possidetis
Indigenous rights

References

Further reading
 Sebastian Anstis and Mark Zacher (June 2010). "The Normative Bases of the Global Territorial Order." Diplomacy and Statecraft 21: 306–323.
 Mark Zacher (2001). "The Territorial Integrity Norm." International Organization 55: 215–250.

International law